Osterode am Harz, often simply called Osterode (Eastphalian: Ostroe), is a town in south-eastern Niedersachsen on the south-western edge of the Harz mountains. It was the seat of government of the district of Osterode. Osterode is located on the German Timber-Frame Road.

Geography

Water
The Söse River flows through the town from the reservoir for the Söse Dam about 5 km upstream. The dam was built in 1931 and has a capacity of 25.5 million m³. The Harzwasserwerke water company pipes drinking water as far away as Bremen.

Districts
The following districts (mainly surrounding villages) are part of the borough of Osterode am Harz, with populations in brackets (as of 1 July 2012):
 Dorste (1,650)
 Düna (140)
 Förste (2,000)
 Freiheit (2,100)
 Kazenstein (1,200)
 Lasfelde (1,300)
 Lerbach (1,000)
 Marke (150)
 Nienstedt am Harz (440)
 Osterode am Harz (11,500)
 Petershütte (800)
 Riefensbeek-Kamschlacken (350)
 Schwiegershausen (1,800)
 Ührde (100)

Political

Local council
The Gemeinderat or council of Osterode has 34 members:
SPD: 16
CDU: 12
Grüne: 3
FDP: 3
 

and one Bürgermeister (mayor).
(local election on 11 September 2016)

Mayor
Jens Augat (SPD) has been Bürgermeister (mayor) of Osterode since 1 November 2019.

Culture and attractions

Museums
The Museum im Ritterhaus displays documents from Osterode's history from the Middle Ages to the recent past, as well as occasional temporary exhibitions.

The Lichtenstein Cave is an archaeological site near Dorste, in the western part of the municipality. Two inhabitants of the village Nienstedt am Harz, 2 km north of the cave, have the same rare DNA pattern as that found in the skeletal material of a man whose bones were found in the Lichtenstein Cave dating to about 1000 BC.

Architecture
In the environs of Osterode there are several castle ruins, and
Lichtenstein Castle between Dorste and Förste.

The town granary built between 1719 and 1722 is one of the most imposing buildings, built to supply the mining villages in the Upper Harz with grain. Today after a comprehensive renovation it has become the town hall.

Recreation
Osterode is the starting point of the 100 km long Harzer Hexenstieg, a hiking trail to Thale.

Transport
The B 243 federal route, built as a divided highway, is the main western link between the northern and southern Harz area. B 241 and B 498 link Solling to the eastern Harz.

Osterode lies on the Herzberg–Seesen railway, with services to Brunswick. In November 2004 the town gained two new stations at a cost of about 1 million Euro, replacing two previous halts and providing a more central access to public transport.

Educational institutions
 Tilman-Riemenschneider-Gymnasium (high school), Osterode am Harz
 Berufsbildende Schulen I des Landkreises Osterode am Harz
 Berufsbildende Schulen II
 Realschule Osterode
 Hauptschule Neustädter Tor

Twin towns – sister cities

Osterode am Harz is twinned with:
 Armentières, France; one of the bridges over the Söse is called "Armentieres Bridge"
 Ostróda, Poland; formerly known as "Osterode" in East Prussia
 Scarborough, United Kingdom

Notable people
Tilman Riemenschneider (1460–1531), sculptor and artist
Andreas Cludius (1555–1624), legal scholar, professor
George William Alberti (1723–1758), essayist
Fritz Jorns (1837–1910), Reichstag delegate (1893–1907), owner of the Osteroder Kupferhammer
Paul Homeyer (1853–1908), concert organist
Otto Wernicke (1893–1965), actor
Renate Krößner (1945–2020), actress
Regina Seeringer (born 1949), politician (CDU)
Ulrich Schreiber (born 1956), geologist, professor and writer
Petra Emmerich-Kopatsch (born 1960), politician (SPD)
Marco Bode (born 1969), footballer

See also

Metropolitan region Hannover-Braunschweig-Göttingen-Wolfsburg

References

External links
 
Town history

 
Towns in the Harz
Göttingen (district)